Highwaymen is a 2004 Canadian thriller film directed by Robert Harmon.  It stars Jim Caviezel, Rhona Mitra, Frankie Faison, and Colm Feore.  The score was composed by Mark Isham.

Plot
A man known only as Rennie (Jim Caviezel) is motivated by revenge to track down and kill the man who ran over his wife, a serial killer (Colm Feore) immobilized by the man himself. The killer uses a wheelchair. He drives a 1972 Cadillac Eldorado to stalk and kill his victims in car accidents. When the serial killer makes a young woman (Rhona Mitra) his next target, the man has to stop the killer once and for all.

Cast 
 Jim Caviezel as Renford James "Rennie" Cray
 Rhona Mitra as Molly Poole
 Colm Feore as Fargo
 Gordon Currie as Ray Boone
 Frankie Faison as Will Macklin
 Andrea Roth as Alex Farrow
 Noam Jenkins as Kelt

Reception

Anna Smith from Empire Magazine gave the film 2/5 stars, writing, "Both the well-choreographed crash scenes and the gritty cinematography hint at a better film. Shame no-one took the time to make it." Jamie Russell from BBC awarded the film 1/5 stars, calling it "a five-lane pileup on the freeway to hell".
Mark Savlov from Austin Chronicle gave the film 2/5 stars, stating that the film "lacks the sprawling, Westernized mythos of The Hitcher and feels, in the end, like a previously owned nightmare sorely in need of a new universal hell joint."

References

External links
 
 
 

2004 films
2004 action thriller films
2004 crime thriller films
American action thriller films
Canadian action thriller films
American crime thriller films
Canadian crime thriller films
English-language Canadian films
American serial killer films
American road movies
2000s English-language films
Films about automobiles
Films directed by Robert Harmon
Films shot in California
Films shot in Toronto
New Line Cinema films
American vigilante films
Films scored by Mark Isham
2000s American films
2000s Canadian films